These shows are worldwide Netflix Originals and have either completed their runs or Netflix stopped producing episodes. A show is also assumed to have ended if there has been no confirmed news of renewal at least nine months after the show's last episode was released.

Drama

Comedy

Kids & family

Miniseries

Animation

Adult animation

Anime

Kids & family

Non-English language scripted

Afrikaans

Arabic

Danish

Dutch

French

German

Hindi

Icelandic

Italian

Japanese

Korean

Mandarin

Norwegian

Polish

Portuguese

Spanish

Swedish

Tamil

Telugu

Thai

Turkish

Unscripted

Docuseries

Reality

Variety

Co-productions
These shows may not be available worldwide due to the distributing deal with the co-production partner networks.

Continuations

Specials

One-time

Episodic

Regional original programming
These shows are originals, because Netflix commissioned or acquired them and had their premier on the service, but they are not available worldwide.

Comedy

Animation

Non-English language scripted

Spanish

Unscripted

Docuseries

Reality

Continuations

Notes

References

Lists of Netflix original programming
Netflix
Netflix